Lonneker is a village in Twente, in the province of Overijssel. It is located in the municipality of Enschede, about 3 km north of the city centre.

History 
The village was first mentioned in the late-10th century as "in Loningheri", and means "settlement on a sandy ridge of the people of Lono (person)". Lonneker is an esdorp which developed in the Early Middle Ages.

The Catholic St. Jacobus de Meerdere was built between 1911 and 1912 as a replacement of the 1820 church. Lonneker was home to 1.546 people in 1840.

In 1811, five  (predecessor of municipality) were split in the municipalities of Lonneker and Enschede. Lonneker used to encircle Enschede. In 1884, a part of the municipality was given to the city. It remained an independent municipality until 1934, when it became a part of Enschede.

Gallery

References

Populated places in Overijssel
Former municipalities of Overijssel
Enschede